Oliver Pike may refer to:

 Oliver Pike (cricketer) (born 1998), Welsh cricketer
 Oliver Pike, a  minor Buffy the Vampire Slayer character
 Oliver G. Pike (1877–1963), wildlife photographer and film maker
 Oliver Pike, former member of SHVPES.

See also 

 Olive Pike